Michael or Mike Thomas may refer to:

Entertainment
 Michael M. Thomas (born 1936), American novelist of financial thrillers
 Michael Tilson Thomas (born 1944), American conductor, pianist, and composer
 Michael Thomas (actor) (1952–2019), British actor
 Mike Thomas (author) (born 1971), British novelist, Pocket Notebook
 Michael Thomas (born 1981), Welsh heavy metal drummer of Bullet for My Valentine
 Michael Thomas (Man Gone Down author), American author
 Michael Damian Thomas, American magazine editor and podcaster
 Michael J Thomas, American saxophonist, songwriter, and vocalist
 Michael Thomas, former guitarist with the metal band Tuff

Sports

American football
 Michael Thomas (defensive back) (born 1989), American football defensive back
 Mike Thomas (running back) (1953–2019), American football running back
 Mike Thomas (wide receiver, born 1987), American football wide receiver
 Michael Thomas (wide receiver, born 1993), American football wide receiver
 Mike Thomas (wide receiver, born 1994), American football wide receiver

Association football/soccer
 Mickey Thomas (footballer) (born 1954), Welsh footballer, played for Manchester United and Chelsea
 Michael Thomas (footballer, born 1967), English footballer, played for Arsenal and Liverpool
 Michael Thomas (soccer) (born 1988), American soccer player
 Michael Thomas (footballer, born 1992), English footballer

Other sports
 Mike Thomas (baseball) (born 1969), American baseball pitcher

Other
 Michael David Thomas (born 1933), former Attorney General of Hong Kong
 Michael E. Thomas (1937–2018), university administrator and professor of industrial engineering
 Mike Thomas (politician) (born 1944), Labour Party member of the UK Parliament who defected to the SDP
 Michael C. Thomas (1948–2019), American entomologist
 Michael Thomas (academic) (born 1969), English professor and author in digital education
 Mike Thomas (athletic director), American university administrator
 Mike Seager Thomas, British archaeologist

See also
 Mick Thomas (born 1960), Australian singer-songwriter
 Michel Thomas (1914–2005), language instructor
 Mickey Thomas (disambiguation)